Chionanthus spicatus grows as a tree up to  tall, with a trunk diameter of up to . The bark is greyish. The fragrant flowers are yellowish green or creamy white. Its fruit is purple-black and round. The specific epithet spicatus (Latin "spiked") refers to its inflorescence. Habitat is forests from sea-level to  altitude. C. spicatus is found in Borneo and the Philippines.

References

spicatus
Plants described in 1851
Trees of Borneo
Trees of the Philippines